Lane Clyde Frost (October 12, 1963 – July 30, 1989) was an American professional rodeo cowboy who specialized in bull riding, and competed in the Professional Rodeo Cowboys Association (PRCA). He was the 1987 PRCA World Champion bull rider and a 1990 ProRodeo Hall of Fame inductee. He was the only rider to score qualified rides on the 1987 PRCA Bucking Bull of the Year and 1990 ProRodeo Hall of Fame bull Red Rock. He sustained severe injuries at the 1989 Cheyenne Frontier Days event when the bull Takin' Care of Business struck him after the ride, and he was pronounced dead at a local hospital.

Early life
At the time of Lane's birth, his parents lived in Lapoint, Utah. His father, Clyde, was on the rodeo circuit as a saddle bronc and bareback rider. His mother, Elsie, went to stay with her parents in Kim, Colorado, and he was born in the hospital in La Junta. He had an older sister, Robin, and a younger brother, Cody.

Frost started riding dairy calves around age 5–6. His first rodeo awards were won when he was 10, at the "Little Buckaroos" Rodeos held in Uintah Basin: first in bareback, second in calf roping, and third in the "bull riding" (calf riding) event. He also competed in wrestling in junior high school. The family then moved to Oklahoma and he attended Atoka High School in Atoka. In Oklahoma, he was the National High School Bull Riding Champion in 1981. He was the Bull Riding Champion of the first Youth National Finals in Fort Worth, Texas, in 1982.

On January 5, 1985, Frost married Kellie Kyle (born 1965), a barrel racer from Quanah, Texas, west of Wichita Falls.

Professional career
Frost joined the PRCA and began rodeoing full-time after graduating from high school in 1982. In 1987, he became the PRCA World Champion Bull Rider at age 24. That same year, the bull Red Rock, owned by Growney Bros. Rodeo Company, was voted Bucking Bull of the Year. In 309 attempts, no one had ever ridden him, and in 1988, at the Challenge of the Champions, Frost rode him in seven exhibition matches and was successful in four out of seven tries. He went on to compete at the Rodeo '88 Challenge Cup held as part of the Cultural Olympiad in association with the 1988 Winter Olympics in Calgary.

Challenge of the Champions

Sometime in 1988, John Growney pondered a special competition between the two 1987 Champions. It was decided that Frost and Red Rock would have seven showdowns at different rodeos in states across the West. The event was titled the "Challenge of the Champions." Red Rock was brought out of retirement and Frost finally rode him to the eight-second whistle for a scoring ride for four of the seven matches.

Death
On July 30, 1989, at Cheyenne Frontier Days in Cheyenne, Wyoming, after completing a successful 85-point ride on a Brahma bull named Takin' Care of Business, who was owned by Bad Company Rodeo, Frost dismounted and landed in the mud. The bull then turned and pressed his right horn on Frost’s back and pushed him against the muddy arena floor (although he was not gored), breaking several of his ribs. He initially rose to his feet, took a couple of steps, waved for help, then  fell to the ground, causing his heart and lungs to be punctured by the broken ribs. Frost was rushed to Memorial Hospital where he was pronounced dead. He was 25 years old. No autopsy was performed. He posthumously finished third in the event.

Takin' Care of Business appeared at the 1990 National Finals Rodeo. He was then retired and put out to stud until he died in 1999.

Frost is buried near his hero and mentor, Freckles Brown, in Mount Olivet Cemetery in Hugo, Oklahoma.

Legacy
After Frost's death, Cody Lambert, one of his traveling partners, created the protective vest that professional cowboys now wear when riding bulls. Later, in 1996, the PBR made protective vests mandatory.
  
In 1994, the biopic based on Frost's life, 8 Seconds, was released. Luke Perry played the role of Frost. Stephen Baldwin was cast as Tuff Hedeman.

Since 1996, the PBR has awarded the Lane Frost/Brent Thurman Award, given for the highest-scoring ride at the PBR World Finals. The Lane Frost Health and Rehabilitation Center in Hugo is dedicated to his memory.

Country music star Garth Brooks paid tribute to Frost in the video for his 1990 hit single "The Dance". Rodeo announcer Randy Schmutz wrote the song "A Smile Like That" about him. The 1993 song "Red Rock" by the Smokin' Armadillos is about him, and he is mentioned at the end of the video for Korn's 2007 song "Hold On".  Aaron Watson's 2012 album, Real Good Time, included the single "July in Cheyenne". Kings of Leon 2013 music video for "Beautiful War" pays homage to Lane Frost.

Frost's parents have authorized Cowboy Bible: The Living New Testament, with a sketch of him on the cover. A documentary titled "The Challenge of the Champions: The Story of Lane Frost and Red Rock" premiered in 2008. It covers the match between them.

After surviving an accident on the last lap of the 2015 Coke Zero 400 at Daytona International Speedway, NASCAR Cup Series driver Austin Dillon waved to the crowd with a similar gesture to that of Frost’s; he later stated that it was in tribute to Frost.

Honors 
 1990 ProRodeo Hall of Fame
 1999 PBR Ring of Honor
 2000 Texas Cowboy Hall of Fame
 2008 Rodeo Hall of Fame in the National Cowboy & Western Heritage Museum
 2003 Cheyenne Frontier Days Hall of Fame
 2017 Bull Riding Hall of Fame
 2017 Molalla Walk of Fame

References

Other sources

External links

PRCA official website
Tribute site

1963 births
1989 deaths
People from Otero County, Colorado
People from Atoka County, Oklahoma
Bull riders
People from Vernal, Utah
Sports deaths in Wyoming
Filmed deaths in sports
Deaths from bleeding
Deaths due to bull attacks
ProRodeo Hall of Fame inductees
Professional Bull Riders: Heroes and Legends